WKVR (88.9 FM) is a radio station broadcasting a contemporary Christian format. Licensed to Flint, Michigan, it is a member of the K-Love radio network.

History
The station signed on in September 1997 as WGRI with an urban gospel format. After Gospel Radio International sold the station to the Educational Media Foundation, WGRI joined K-Love on October 1, 2001, and changed its call letters to WAKL on October 29. The station became WKMF on May 31, 2019, after EMF moved the WAKL call sign to a station it had acquired in the Atlanta market.

The station changed its call sign to WKVR on December 6, 2022.

Translators

References

External links
 
 
 
 
 

KVR
Contemporary Christian radio stations in the United States
K-Love radio stations
Radio stations established in 1998
1998 establishments in Michigan
Educational Media Foundation radio stations
KVR